Edward J. Samp was an American football coach and politician of German Catholic heritage during the early 20th century. In 1913, he became the head football coach at Hamilton College in Clinton, New York.

College student and athlete
Samp attended the University of Wisconsin–Madison, where he was a member of Phi Beta Kappa. A talented athlete, he played baseball, rowed, and was an all-conference performer in football. Samp lettered in  three season on the football team under coaches Thomas A. Barry, John R. Richards, and William Juneau. He played fullback for the 1910 and 1911 season, but moved to tackle for the 1912 season. This move helped the 1912 team to win the Western Conference title. After the season, he was named All-Western tackle as well as mentioned in Walter Camp's 1912 All-American review.

College coach
After graduating from Wisconsin, Samp became head football coach of Hamilton College for the 1914 season. That season his squad won three games, lost four games, and tied one. The following year, he became an assistant football coach at his alma mater, the University of Wisconsin. In 1918 The New York Times reported that he had taken a head coach position at Williams College.

Later life
Samp later went into real estate in Wisconsin. He ran for State Treasurer in the Republican primary against Solomon Levitan in 1930 as part of a movement to remove progressives from statewide office. He lost the vote by 360,110 to 219,915. After the election he continued to be involved in politics, including serving as State Republican Chairman. He died on December 20, 1967, at the age of 78.

References

External links
 Edward Samp, Wisconsin State Republican Chairman with other State Chairmen – Library of Congress Digital Collections

1880s births
1967 deaths
American football fullbacks
American football tackles
Hamilton Continentals football coaches
Wisconsin Badgers baseball players
Wisconsin Badgers football players
Wisconsin Badgers rowers
Businesspeople from Wisconsin
Wisconsin Republicans